Sadatarō Hiraoka (July 19, 1863 – August 26, 1942) was the third Director of Karafuto Prefecture (11 June 1908 – 3 June 1914), and the 17th governor of Fukushima Prefecture (1906–1908). He was from Harima Province, and was a graduate of the University of Tokyo. Yukio Mishima was his grandchild.

Notes

References

External links
 平岡定太郎の墓
 福島県知事、平岡定太郎の経歴について知りたい - リファレンス共同データベース

1863 births
1942 deaths
Governors of Fukushima Prefecture
Directors of the Karafuto Agency
Japanese Home Ministry government officials
Politicians from Hyōgo Prefecture
University of Tokyo alumni